Contemporary Western is a sub-genre of the Western genre that includes contemporary settings and use Old West themes, archetypes, and motifs, such as a rebellious antihero, open plains and desert landscapes, or gunfights.  This sub-genre also includes the Post-Western, neo-Western, Urban Western genres with modern settings and "the cowboy cult" that involve the audience's feelings and understanding of Western movies. The contemporary Western "partly involves attempting to combine or reconcile the conventions of an older popular form with those of contemporary cinema." A neo-Western can be said to use Western themes set in the present day. According to Stephen Teo in Eastern Westerns: Film and Genre Outside and Inside Hollywood, there is little difference between the Neo-Western and Post-Western, and the terms may often be used interchangeably.

Setting 
Some neo-Westerns still take place in the American West and reveal the progression of the Old West mentality into the late 20th and early 21st centuries. This subgenre often features Old West-type characters struggling with displacement in a "civilized" world that rejects their outdated brand of justice.  However, the Contemporary Western need not be limited to the traditional American West setting.  Coogan's Bluff and Midnight Cowboy are examples of Urban Westerns set in New York City. The Neo-Western television series Justified is set in Eastern Kentucky.

Motif and themes 
Taylor Sheridan's filmography can be used as a template to identify what being a neo-Western means, with three identifying themes. First is the lack of rules, with morals guided by the character's or audience's instincts of right and wrong rather than by governance. The second is characters searching for justice. The third theme, characters feeling remorse, connects the neo-Western to the broader Western genre, reinforcing a universal theme that consequences come with actions. Other conventions of the genre include "virility and thus patriarchal rights... secured through public performances of competence; and competence, in turn, is measured and proven in (successful) acts of violence."

Development 
Beginning in the postwar era, radio dramas such as Tales of the Texas Rangers (1950–1952), with Joel McCrea, a contemporary detective drama set in Texas, featured many of the characteristics of traditional Westerns.  In this period, Post-Western precursors to the modern neo-Western films began to appear.  This includes films such as Nicholas Ray's The Lusty Men (1952) and John Sturges's Bad Day at Black Rock (1955). Examples of the modern "first phase" of neo-Westerns include films such as Lonely Are the Brave (1962) and Hud (1963).  The popularity of the subgenre has been resurgent since the release of Joel and Ethan Coen's No Country for Old Men (2007).

The subgenre can also be seen in television in shows such as Breaking Bad.  According to Breaking Bad creator Vince Gilligan, "After the first Breaking Bad episode, it started to dawn on me that we could be making a contemporary Western. So you see scenes that are like gunfighters squaring off, like Clint Eastwood and Lee van Cleef—we have Walt and others like that."

Many so-called "space Westerns" can be classed within the neo-Western genre, as well, particularly if the science fiction elements are of secondary importance to the Western characteristics of the plotlines. Some well-known examples include the original TV series Star Trek (1966–1969), the film Mad Max (1979), and the Joss Whedon TV series Firefly (2002).

List of Contemporary Westerns

This list is not exhaustive. It includes major films and television labelled contemporary Western, neo-Western, Post-Western, or Urban Western. The list highlights the media released to illustrate the development of the concept over time.

Films

 Midnight Cowboy (1969)
 Dirty Harry (1971)
 The Getaway (1972)
 Junior Bonner (1972)
 J. W. Coop (1972)
 Bring Me the Head of Alfredo Garcia (1974)
 Hearts of the West (1975)
 Assault on Precinct 13 (1976)
 Comes a Horseman (1978)
 Lone Wolf McQuade (1983)
 Flashpoint (1984)
 Extreme Prejudice (1987)
 El Mariachi (1992)
 Red Rock West (1993)
 Desperado (1995)
 Once Upon a Time in Mexico (2003)
 Lone Star (1996)
 The Way of the Gun (2000)
 Down in the Valley (2005)
 Kill Bill: Volume 2 (2004)
 The Three Burials of Melquiades Estrada (2005)
 Brokeback Mountain (2005)
 Don't Come Knocking (2005)
 No Country for Old Men (2007)
 Gran Torino (2008)
 Crazy Heart (2009)
 Out of the Furnace (2013)
 Mystery Road (2013)
 The Rover (2014)
 Hell or High Water (2016)
 Wind River (2017)
 Logan (2017)
 Nomadland (2020)
 Cry Macho (2021)
 The Last Victim (2021)
 Nope (2022)

Television

 Cade's County (1971–1972)
 Walker, Texas Ranger (1993–2001)
 Breaking Bad (2008–2013)
 Sons of Anarchy (2008–2014)
 Justified (2010–2015)
 Longmire (2012–2017)
 Mystery Road (2018–present)
 Yellowstone (2018–present)
 Too Old to Die Young (2019)
 Walker (2021–present)
 Joe Pickett (2021–present)
 Outer Range (2022–present)
 Dark Winds (2022–present)

References

 
Western (genre) films by genre
Western (genre) subgenres